Jan Holger Eriksson (born January 14, 1958) is a Swedish former ice hockey defenceman.

Eriksson played in the Swedish Elitserien for MODO Hockey, AIK and VIK Västerås HK.

He participated notably in the 1980 Olympic Winter Games in Lake Placid, New York, where Sweden won bronze in ice hockey tournament.

External links

1958 births
Living people
AIK IF players
Ice hockey players at the 1980 Winter Olympics
Modo Hockey players
Olympic bronze medalists for Sweden
Olympic ice hockey players of Sweden
Olympic medalists in ice hockey
People from Sollefteå Municipality
Swedish ice hockey defencemen
VIK Västerås HK players
Medalists at the 1980 Winter Olympics
Sportspeople from Västernorrland County